In geometry, a rotunda is any member of a family of dihedral-symmetric polyhedra. They are similar to a cupola but instead of alternating squares and triangles, it alternates pentagons and triangles around an axis. The pentagonal rotunda is a Johnson solid.

Other forms can be generated with dihedral symmetry and distorted equilateral pentagons.

Examples

Star-rotunda

See also 
 Birotunda

References
Norman W. Johnson, "Convex Solids with Regular Faces", Canadian Journal of Mathematics, 18, 1966, pages 169–200. Contains the original enumeration of the 92 solids and the conjecture that there are no others.
  The first proof that there are only 92 Johnson solids.

Johnson solids